The 2011 Pacific Netball series was held in Port Moresby, Papua New Guinea between 7-9 June 2011.

Results

Table

Final standings

See also
 Pacific Netball Series

References

 2011 Pacific Netball Series, PNG. Papua New Guinea netball webpage
 The Pacific Islanders are Coming to PNG. Papua New Guinea netball webpage

Pacific
2011
2011 in Oceanian sport
International netball competitions hosted by Papua New Guinea
2011 in Cook Islands sport
2011 in Fijian sport
2011 in Papua New Guinean sport
2011 in Samoan sport